Hafiz Pakzad (born 1955) is a prominent Afghan painter.

Life 
He is considered one of the painters of the second golden age of Realism in Afghanistan, along with Karim Shah Khan, Abdul Ghafoor Breshna, Ghulam Mohieddin Shabnam, Mohammad Maimanagi and Akbar Khorasani.

References 

Afghan painters
1955 births
Living people